Czech Radio 1 is an alternative radio broadcasting company based in Prague, Czech Republic, at 91.9 MHz in and around the city. Having started out as a pirate station, Radio 1 began broadcasting as a regular FM station in the spring of 1991, as the first privately owned Czech commercial radio station. It is also popular amongst Czechs living abroad who listen to it online. It is a freeform format.

Content
Radio 1 mostly to focuses on alternative and independent music and culture of genres including electronic, rock, jazz, reggae, and ambient, rather than pop music. The station has about 30 specialist shows including Blue Train (jazz session), CD Nonstop (a whole CD recording is played every day), Film o páté ("Film at Five" - a program about current movies), French Connection (news from the alternative French music scene), Hard Music (heavy metal and related music program), Hitparáda Radia 1 ("the hit parade of Radio 1" - foreign music top 40), Knižní servis ("the book service" - a discussion of new books), Reggae club (reggae), Shadowbox (news from the Drum and bass scene), Velká sedma ("the great seven" - Czech music hit parade), Všechny hudby světa ("all music of the world" - world music program) or Zátiší ("the still life" - discussion program with invited guests). It is one of few Czech radio stations to have shows with English speaking presenters.

References

External links
Czech Radio 1

Radio stations in the Czech Republic
Radio stations established in 1991